Major Disaster is a former DC Comics supervillain and reluctant amoral superhero.

Publication history
Major Disaster debuted in Green Lantern (volume 2) #43 and was created by Gardner Fox and Gil Kane.

Fictional character biography
Paul Booker was nothing more than a cheap crook. On the run from the police, he found an unlocked apartment window and climbed in to hide out.

Unbeknownst to him, it belonged to Thomas Kalmaku, Green Lantern's former friend and confidant. Accidentally activating a hidden control panel, he discovered Kalmaku's casebook on Green Lantern. Using this, he found out the secret identities of both Green Lantern and the Flash.

Armed with this knowledge, he decided to embark on a criminal career under the name of "Major Disaster", and hired a group of criminal scientists to create devices for him capable of causing natural disasters. Using his new powers, he set out to kill the crime fighters, but was defeated and was thought to have died in the ensuing explosion. Disaster was revealed to wear a device that protected him from any disaster he created. This device made his atoms reform over time, invisibly returning him to human form, but his luck against Green Lantern failed to improve, as he was defeated again.

After his defeat, Green Lantern used his ring to erase the memory of the Flash's secret identity and placed a mental block stopping him from telling anyone else about the Green Lantern's own identity.

Major Disaster threatened the United Nations on behalf of the racist group Nurike. He attempted
to destroy the UN Manhattan buildings using a master fissure he started, but was stopped by Karate Kid. He would later join forces with the Lord of Time in order to torment the Karate Kid.

Insanity
Booker found that his power had started to internalize in him, but was growing in magnitude and slowly destroying him. He sought to remove the excess power by transferring it onto Superman, and was defeated again. Superman, aided by Batman, also defeated him when he joined General Scarr's Army of Crime.

Seeking to finally kill Green Lantern, Booker threatened to destroy the Baldwin Hills Dam unless Jordan faced him. At the time, John Stewart had taken the Green Lantern mantle and when he arrived at the dam, Disaster was confused, as he still believed Jordan was Green Lantern. Believing that Green Lantern was ridiculing him, he destroyed the dam and nearly the majority of Los Angeles. Due to one of Lantern's constructs, Disaster was defeated and went insane, believing everybody to be Green Lantern.

For a time, Booker served as an operative of the international crime cartel known only as SKULL when its leader, Simon Pons, recruited him into the cartel. Both Booker and SKULL ran afoul of the Outsiders when SKULL began kidnapping prominent scientists, superheroes, and millionaires. He also caused the destruction of the Outsiders' Station Markovia headquarters, making it sink off the coast of Los Angeles.

Injustice League
It was while in prison that Disaster first met the Mighty Bruce, a computer wizard who stole money from huge corporations to give to charity. The Mighty Bruce suddenly seemed vital to Disaster's future plans of a villainous team: the Injustice League. The team consists of Disaster as leader, the Mighty Bruce, Multi-Man, Cluemaster, Big Sir, and Clock King. Disaster and the League came into possession of a Thanagarian warship left over from a recent alien invasion of Earth and planned to use the weapons on board to attack the Justice League. Unfortunately for them, Guy Gardner, who was clearing up a Khund warship close by, intercepted their radio transmission and met the ship. He tore the craft into pieces and took the League into custody.

Once free, the League decides that their criminal career would be easier in Europe and traveled to Paris to set up base, but the Justice League Europe branch had just opened its doors and the League found themselves in the same "French for Beginners" class as the JLE. A scuffle soon breaks out. They are quickly deported from France. Their next mission involves breaking the bank at the Club JLI casino on the island of Kooey Kooey Kooey. Whilst this operation was a success, they are unable to spend their winnings as the Island started to drift into the ocean (it turns out the island was sentient). Recruited by the JLA, Disaster helps avoid the ensuing geological and tectonic chaos by assisting Aquaman in anchoring the island to an underground volcano. He then chooses to stay and face justice rather than flee, despite having the opportunity.

Justice League Antarctica
Attempting to go legit, the Injustice League were given a chance by Maxwell Lord, the then-chief of the JLI. They somehow managed to stop a terrorist attack and were subsequently sent to the South Pole to form the Justice League Antarctica, along with other nuisances G'nort and the Scarlet Skier. The team was short-lived, as Disaster destroyed their embassy whilst defeating a waddle of killer penguins. The team, though lacking an embassy, stayed together, acting as bodyguards for Maxwell Lord when he was in a gunshot-induced coma. They also joined the American and European Leagues, the team called the Conglomerate, and the intergalactic bounty hunter Lobo in pitched battle against Despero. Major Disaster, in an effort to stop Despero, turned Times Square into smoking rubble. Afterwards, they departed from the League.

Back to villainy
Following this, the group returned to crime. They attempted to steal from the cult of Minister Sun, only to have their loot stolen back from them. Disaster's career took a boost when he accepted a deal from Neron that greatly enhanced his disaster-causing powers, making feats much easier and giving him far more disasters to cause, at the cost of his soul. Apparently at Neron's direction, Major Disaster lived up to his name when, in Aquaman vol. 5 #14, he caused a series of events to occur that resulted in the destruction of a commercial airplane and a military submarine with all onboard both vessels killed.  This destruction also caused the death of Thanatos, a minor Aquaman villain who had sought to replace the King of Atlantis.

Suicide Squad
The Injustice League team then received an offer from the government to work on the Suicide Squad. Major Disaster agreed, even 'volunteering' Multi-Man against his will. They were sent to a small island off the coast of Iceland, to deal with a terrorist situation and an out-of-control genetic experiment. Lifeless, explosive genetic constructs who looked like kids killed Big Sir. The rest of the 'children' were shrunk by Multi-Man, who had that power in his current incarnation. Multi-Man was shot through the head soon after, but in the past he has come back from worse; on the other hand, Clock King, who had no such powers, was shot repeatedly. In the resulting chaos, Major Disaster perceived that Cluemaster saved his life at least twice, before also being shot dead. Cluemaster survived his injuries, but with multiple scars.

Disaster stayed with the Squad until Superman gave him a chance to prove his heroic worth in defeating a number of Superman's foes.

Hero again
Batman also followed Disaster's career, and the Dark Knight chose him to serve on a substitute Justice League of America while the regular members went back in time to Atlantis, the other members of the team being Nightwing, Green Arrow, Atom, Hawkgirl, Faith, Firestorm and Jason Blood. The original League's final fate was unknown to the team, and for some time, they thought the original JLA had perished.

Finally acting as a hero and receiving some respect for the first time in his career, Disaster jumped at the chance and remained with the team following their return and the subsequent battle with the powerful Atlantean sorceress Gamemnae. After joining, he became extremely close to Faith and is the only person in the League to have seen her true form.

Major Disaster later joined the Justice League Elite, a covert-ops arm of the Justice League led by Sister Superior. During the JLElite  series, it was revealed that he was an alcoholic. Later, while fighting with the Justice Society of America, Booker used his powers while hung-over, resulting in Hawkgirl being severely injured, and, later on, in the death of teammate Manitou Raven. At the end of the Justice League Elite series, he resigned from the League and asked them to 'wait a few months before sending any visitors in capes'.

Death
During Infinite Crisis, Major Disaster was present at the Battle of Metropolis. He is quickly killed by Superboy-Prime amidst the chaos.

During the events of Blackest Night, Major Disaster is reanimated as a member of the Black Lantern Corps along with the other heroes killed by Superboy-Prime and who head for Earth Prime to torment him. Superboy-Prime destroys them by using the black ring cycling through the power set of emotions resulting in a burst of colored energy that destroys Black Lanterns.

Post-Flashpoint
In the New 52, Booker returned in Superman/Wonder Woman confronting the heroes alongside the Atomic Skull.  His daughter Penny aka Minor Disaster  debuted in the Harley Quinn comic utilizing a version of the H-Dial called "Disaster Dial" and teaming up with her neglectful father.

Powers and abilities
Major Disaster's powers originally came from a set of weapons he used to cause natural disasters. Over time, exposure to these weapons made the powers internalize and now Disaster can cause chaos at will. His deal with Neron greatly enhanced his powers, enabling him to see the strands of chaos around him. The disasters he can now control theoretically range from being able to command asteroid showers without breaking a sweat to causing heart attacks, nose bleeds, and even making people trip up. He appears to have no real limitations, though he lacks fine control. He has devised a force field for himself, using his powers to redirect attacks, though he seems not to use it much. While Major Disaster is adept at creating chaos, it takes him great effort to stop disasters, whether his own or natural.

In other media
 Major Disaster makes minor non-speaking appearances in Justice League Unlimited as a member of Gorilla Grodd's Secret Society. Prior to and during the events of the episode "Alive!", Lex Luthor takes command of the Society, but Grodd mounts a mutiny. Disaster sides with the latter, only to be frozen by Killer Frost and killed off-screen by Darkseid along with Grodd's other loyalists.
 Major Disaster appears in Batman: The Brave and the Bold, voiced by James Arnold Taylor. In his most notable appearance in the episode "Hail the Tornado Tyrant!", he battles Batman, Red Tornado, and the latter's creation Tornado Champion, damaging Tornado Champion in the process before he is defeated and contributing to Tornado Champion becoming the Tornado Tyrant.

References

Fictional characters with energy-manipulation abilities
DC Comics characters with superhuman strength
DC Comics supervillains
DC Comics superheroes
DC Comics metahumans
Fictional characters who can manipulate probability
Green Lantern characters
Characters created by Gil Kane
Characters created by Gardner Fox
Comics characters introduced in 1966